Ernst Brunner (born 5 September 1950)  is a Swedish writer and literary scholar.

Brunner was born in Tullinge to alpine skiers Leo and Gertrud Brunner. His thesis from 1985 is a treatment of Edith Södergran. His early fictional works include the poetry collections Jag ändrar ställning klokkan tre from 1979, Söderväggar from 1980, and I det stora och hela from 1982, and the novels Känneru brorsan? (1980), Dans på rovor (1983), and Svarta villan (1987). His novel Edith from 1992 is a fictional treatment of Edith Södergren, Fukta din aska (2002) is a biographical novel on Carl Michael Bellman, and Carolus Rex (2005) is a biographical novel on Charles XII of Sweden. In 2019 he published Likt ett skeleton, a historical biography of Johan Helmich Roman.

He was awarded the Dobloug Prize in 2019.

References

1950 births
Living people
Writers from Stockholm
Swedish poets
Swedish novelists
Swedish literary historians
Dobloug Prize winners